This is a list of television serial dramas released by TVB in 2023, including highest-rated television dramas and award ceremonies.

Top ten drama series in ratings
The following is a list of TVB's top serial dramas in 2023 by viewership ratings. The recorded ratings include premiere week, final week, finale episode, and the average overall count of live Hong Kong viewers (in millions).

Awards

First line-up
These dramas air in Hong Kong every Monday to Sunday from 8:00 pm to 8:30 pm on Jade.

Second line-up
These dramas air in Hong Kong from 8:30 pm to 9:30 pm, Monday to Friday on Jade.
Remark: Starting on 21 Jan 2023 through 28 Jan 2023 from 8:30 pm to 9:30 pm on Jade.

Third line-up
These dramas air in Hong Kong from 9:30 pm to 10:30 pm, Monday to Friday on Jade

References

External links
   

2023
2020s in Hong Kong television